Normandy Park is a city in King County, Washington, United States. The population was 6,771 at the 2010 census.

History
Normandy Park was officially incorporated on June 8, 1953.  The city is located in King County and is bordered on the north by the City of Burien and by the City of Des Moines to the south.

The Seattle-Tacoma Land Company was organized in the mid-1920s for the purpose of developing  of land on the shores of Puget Sound between Seattle and Tacoma. The development was to be known as Normandy Park, a planned residential community with strict building codes and numerous restrictions. It was to be a community of distinctive architecture in the French Normandy style, and there was to be a yacht club, two community beaches and a golf course.

By 1929, the entire area had been platted. Good gravel roads were built and a water system installed that was fed from deep wells in the area. An elegant clubhouse was built on what is now known as "Lot A," and promotional efforts such as free refreshments and band concerts were offered there to promote Normandy Park. Building started with a distinctive brick house on Lot 1, Block 20, built by C. S. Hughett. This house was considered to be the first built according to the plans of the developers. The house is located at 17999 Normandy Terrace SW. A few other houses in the French Normandy style were built soon after, as well as two Prudence Penny Budget houses.

The depression brought a halt to all development activities of Normandy Park and the Seattle-Tacoma Land Company abandoned the project. The clubhouse was sold to the late Ben Tipp in 1934, and much of the property passed into private hands.

In the late 1940s and early 1950s, Normandy Park was rediscovered and, within a few years, many fine homes were built. In a short time it became a vigorous community, so much so that on June 8, 1953, the residents incorporated the area into the City of Normandy Park.

Geography
Normandy Park is located at  (47.437341, -122.343310).

Demographics

2010 census
As of the census of 2010, there were 6,335 people, 2,620 households, and 1,850 families living in the city. The racial makeup of the city was 86.4% White, 0.8% African American, 0.9% Native American, 5.9% Asian, 0.3% Pacific Islander, 1.3% from other races, and 4.4% from two or more races. Hispanic or Latino of any race were 5.2% of the population.

There were 2,620 households, of which 28.4% had children under the age of 18 living with them, 60.3% were married couples living together, 7.3% had a female householder with no husband present, 3.0% had a male householder with no wife present, and 29.4% were non-families. 25.2% of all households were made up of individuals, and 13.3% had someone living alone who was 65 years of age or older. The average household size was 2.42 and the average family size was 2.88.

The median age in the city was 48.7 years. 20.4% of residents were under the age of 18; 5.7% were between the ages of 18 and 24; 17.8% were from 25 to 44; 35% were from 45 to 64; and 21.2% were 65 years of age or older. The gender makeup of the city was 48.8% male and 51.2% female.

2000 census
As of the census of 2000, there were 6,392 people, 2,609 households, and 1,933 families living in the city. The population density was 2,597.3 people per square mile (1,003.2/km2). There were 2,670 housing units at an average density of 1,084.9 per square mile (419.1/km2). The racial makeup of the city was 90.21% White, 1.14% African American, 0.39% Native American, 4.60% Asian, 0.23% Pacific Islander, 0.80% from other races, and 2.63% from two or more races. Hispanic or Latino of any race were 2.44% of the population.

There were 2,609 households, out of which 30.1% had children under the age of 18 living with them, 65.5% were married couples living together, 6.3% had a female householder with no husband present, and 25.9% were non-families. 22.0% of all households were made up of individuals, and 11.7% had someone living alone who was 65 years of age or older. The average household size was 2.45 and the average family size was 2.86.

In the city the population was spread out, with 22.2% under the age of 18, 5.0% from 18 to 24, 21.9% from 25 to 44, 30.6% from 45 to 64, and 20.3% who were 65 years of age or older. The median age was 46 years. For every 100 females, there were 92.9 males. For every 100 females age 18 and over, there were 92.2 males.

The median income for a household in the city was $70,367, and the median income for a family was $78,102. Males had a median income of $54,500 versus $40,018 for females. The per capita income for the city was $33,845. About 2.0% of families and 4.0% of the population were below the poverty line, including 4.1% of those under age 18 and 6.1% of those age 65 or over.

Government and politics
The city is classified in the Revised Code of Washington as a "second class city" with a "council/manager form of government." The city government consists of seven elected council members, one of whom is selected as Mayor by the Council themselves and serves as chair of the council.

References

External links
 City of Normandy Park

Cities in King County, Washington
Cities in the Seattle metropolitan area
Cities in Washington (state)